Macapta is a genus of moths of the family Noctuidae.

Species
Macapta albivitta Hampson, 1910
Macapta carnescens (Schaus, 1906)
Macapta dileuca Hampson, 1910
Macapta grisea (Kohler, 1968)
Macapta holophaea H. Druce, 1908
Macapta lurida (Schaus, 1894)
Macapta lydia E. D. Jones, 1912
Macapta marginata (Schaus, 1904)
Macapta mursa (Schaus, 1894)
Macapta niveigutta (Schaus, 1904)
Macapta obliqua E. D. Jones, 1915
Macapta psectrocera Hampson, 1910
Macapta rubrescens Hampson, 1910

References

Hadeninae